Frank Edmond (born 23 December 1968) is a German former footballer.

References

External links

1968 births
Living people
German footballers
East German footballers
East Germany under-21 international footballers
1. FC Lokomotive Leipzig players
Eintracht Braunschweig players
Bundesliga players
2. Bundesliga players
Association football defenders
Footballers from Leipzig
People from Bezirk Leipzig